Live At Blue Cat Blues is an album by Los Lonely Boys that was recorded in November 2000 at Blue Cat Blues in Dallas, Texas.  It was officially released in 2006.  There are several different versions, with a different track order, and in some cases, more or less tracks than listed below; the track list below is the most current and complete available.  The titles shown are on the album jacket; titles in parentheses are the common titles for the songs.  The song "I Don't Want To Lose Your Love" was selected to be on Santana's third shared album, All That I Am.

Track listing
 "Scuttlebuttin'"
 "Friday Night (early version)"
 "I Don't Want To Lose Your Love (early version)"
 "Heaven"
 "Friday Night"
 "Dime Mi Amor"
 "Baby You're Gonna See (Nobody's Fool)"
 "I Want You To Feel The Same Way That I Do (If)"
 "I Am The Man To Beat"
 "I Don't Want To Lose Your Love"
 "Cottonfields and Crossroads"
 "Señorita"
 "I'm Gone"
 "My Sweet Kiss"
 "Pride & Joy"
 "End Of A New Beginning"

Los Lonely Boys albums
2006 live albums